Gymnasium Kadaň is a Czech regional gymnasium in the Ústí nad Labem Region of Kadaň. It is the oldest school in Kadaň and fifth oldest in Ústí nad Labem Region. The school was established in 1803 with 99 students and continued under the control of the Piarists until 1823. The institute of Gymnasium was then reestablished in 1872 in a new building. The Gymnasium was again closed in 1951 by communist education reform. A new Gymnasium was established in 1958.

Notable alumni and teacher 
 Howorka Franciscus Wenzel - (1851-1913) educator, naturalist, author fishery textbook
 P. Virgil Grimmich - (1861-1903) philosopher, theologian, professor at the University of Vienna and Prague
 Karl Wilhelm Gawalowski - (1861-1945) writer, librarian
 Karl Prodinger - (1875-1948) educator
 Carl Furtmüller - (1880-1951) educator, 
 Victor Hadwiger - (1878-1911) poet, writer
 Josef Heinrich - (1879-1943) forest engineer and writer
 Petr Hlaváček - (1974) historian
 Theodor Innitzer - (1875-1955) Archbishop of Vienna and a cardinal
 Alfred Kleinberg - (1881-1939) professor
 Miroslava Kopicová - (1951) Czech politician
 Vojtěch Kraus - (1944) professor and painter
 Josef von Löschner - (1809-1888) pioneer of modern European balneologie
 Johann Nepomuk Oettl - (1801-1866) founder of Czech modern beekeeping
 Robert Anton Pöpl - (1812-1866) Franciscan priest, father of orphans
 Josef Chaim Sagher - (1875-1946) Zionist, last Rabbi's Kadaň
 Walter Serner - (1889-1942) writer, essayist and co-founder of dada
 Heribert Sturm - (1879-1981) historian, archivist
 Hugo Karl Tippmann - (1875-1942) American poet and journalist

External links 
 Gymnasium
 Municipal website

Schools in the Czech Republic
Kadaň
Secondary education
Kadaň